Almont Elementary School may refer to:
 Almont Elementary School - Almont, Michigan - Almont Community Schools
 Almont Elementary School - Almont, North Dakota - Sims School District 8